Abbas Noyan is an ethnic Hazara politician.
He is Afghanistan's ambassador to Sweden, from the Islamic Republic that fell in August 2021 to the Taliban. Previously he served as a Member of Parliament to Wolesi Jirga, the lower house, representing the people of Kabul province from 2005 to 2010.
In 2005, he ranked seventh among candidates from Kabul province, quickly rising to one of the most prominent and active representatives at the Wolesi Jirga.
During his tenure, he advocated for women's rights, education for all, a responsive and accountable government, and a strong rule of law. Noyan has worked across ethnic and sectarian divides in representing his constituents, and sought to bridge those divides by establishing a multi-ethnic political party.

Early life and education 
Abbas Noyan hails from Turkman Valley of Parwan province and grew up in Kabul. He was born into a politically active family; his father Haji Saleh Mohammad Khan was one of the elders of Hazaras and served as a Member of Parliament during Dawood Shah's reign. Abbas Noyan became politically active while still in high school, fighting against systematic discrimination of minority groups and for a responsive and accountable government for all. For his peaceful political protests, he was briefly imprisoned, suspended from school, and dispatched to serve his mandatory military service in the Asmar district of Kunar province, one of the most dangerous parts of the country.

Abbas Noyan went on to study civil engineering at Polytechnic Institute. His classmates included Ahmad Shah Masood and Gulbuddin Hekmatyar.

Family life and career 

At the time of Abbas's graduation from university, the country was becoming increasingly socially and politically unrestful. To suppress the population, the communist regime of Hafizullah Amin decreed the elimination and execution of any person with influence and prominence and who fought for the human and political rights of the people. In 1978, Haji Saleh Mohammad Khan and his three sons were taken away in the middle of the night by the secret police and executed. Abbas barely escaped capture. The family learned of the fate of Haji Saleh and his sons 35 years later including the place of their mass burial.

Abbas Noyan became the sole provider for his extended family. He started his business and ran it in Russia, U.S., Japan, and the U.A.E. After establishing himself in business, he returned to his country in 2005 and ran for parliament.

Abbas Noyan is identified as progressive and reformist. He represented the Kabul province in parliament, becoming one of the most vocal critics of widespread corruption. He advocated for women's rights and the elimination of violence against women.

After his term at the national assembly, he founded the Truth and Justice political party (also known as Rights and Justice) together with Hanif Atmar, Ehsanullah Zia, Sima Samar, Mohammad Sardar Roshan, and Hamidullah Farooqi. The party successfully supported Ashraf Ghani's bid to the presidency in 2014.

Personal 
A lifelong supporter of education, he sits on the board of Marefat High School.

Noyan has three sons and two daughters. Currently he lives in Stockholm Sweden with his family.

See also 

 Truth and Justice
 List of Hazara people

References 

Living people
1949 births
Hazara politicians
Afghan engineers
Members of the House of the People (Afghanistan)
Kabul Polytechnic University alumni
People from Parwan Province
People from Kabul